is a major north-south national highway on the Sea of Japan side of the island of Honshū, Japan. It traverses four prefectures, with Niigata at its southern end, then Yamagata, Akita, and finally, Aomori at its northern end. Travelling north, the highway links the prefectural capitals Akita and Aomori. In central Aomori the highway ends at the northern terminus of National Route 4 and National Route 45.

Route description
The highway's origin and southern terminus lies in Chuo-ku, Niigata at junction with national routes 8, 17, 113, 116, 289, 350, and 402. The highway passes through Shibata, Murakami, Tsuruoka, Sakata, Yurihonjō, Akita, Noshiro, Ōdate, and Hirosaki. Its endpoint and northern terminus lies in Aomori at a junction with national routes 4 and 45.

History
What eventually became National Route 7 between Aburakawa-juku in present-day Aomori and Tsuchizakiminato-juku in Akita was established during the Edo period by Tokugawa Ieyasu as the Ushū Hama Kaidō and Ushū Kaidō, subroutes of the Ōshū Kaidō.

National Route 7 was established by the Cabinet of Japan roughly along the aforementioned section of the Ushū Kaidō as well as a new road south to Niigata on 4 December 1952 as First Class National Highway 7 between Niigata and Aomori. It's designationation was changed to General National Highway 7 on 1 April 1965.

Major intersections
All junctions listed are at-grade intersections unless noted otherwise.

Gallery

See also

References

External links

007
Roads in Akita Prefecture
Roads in Aomori Prefecture
Roads in Niigata Prefecture
Roads in Yamagata Prefecture